Miyun Reservoir is a large-scale reservoir in Miyun District, Beijing, China, straddling the Chao River (潮河) and Bai River (白河). There are two major rivers flowing into the reservoir, namely the Bai River and the Chao River. The reservoir was formally completed on September 1, 1960.

Miyun Reservoir is the largest comprehensive water conservancy project in North China. The reservoir covers an area of 180 square kilometers, with a reservoir capacity of 4 billion cubic meters and an average depth of 30 meters, making it the largest and only source of drinking-water supply for Beijing, serving over 11 million people.

Miyun Reservoir is the largest artificial lake in Asia and is billed as the "Pearl in North China" (华北明珠).

History
Construction of Miyun Reservoir started on 1 September 1958 and was completed in September 1960. The chief designer of the project was Zhang Guangdou. 

Miyun Reservoir was designed by the Department of Water Resources of Tsinghua University, with the participation of a large number of migrant workers from Beijing, Tianjin and Hebei, and the Engineering Bureau of the Ministry of Water Resources and Electric Power.

Surrounding environment
Along the Miyun Reservoir, there is a 110-kilometer-long Huanku Road (环库公路).

References 

Miyun District
Reservoirs in China
1960 establishments in China
Buildings and structures in Beijing
Infrastructure completed in 1960